Wood fibres (also spelled wood fibers, see spelling differences) are usually cellulosic elements that are extracted from trees and used to make materials including paper.

The end paper product (paper, paperboard, tissue, cardboard, etc.) dictates the species, or species blend, that is best suited to provide the desirable sheet characteristics, and also dictates the required fibre processing (chemical treatment, heat treatment, mechanical "brushing" or refining, etc.).

In North America, virgin (non-recycled) wood fibre is primarily extracted from hardwood (deciduous) trees and softwood (coniferous) trees. The wood fibre can be extracted as a primary product, or collected during the milling of lumber.  Wood fibres can also be recycled from used paper materials.

Paper
Wood fibres are treated by combining them with other additives which break down the fibres into a spongy mass called pulp.  The pulp is then processed, and the network of tiny fibres is pressed flat, becoming paper.

Construction material
Wood fibres can be pressed into hard, flat panels which can be used as a less expensive alternative to wood or plywood in situations not requiring structural strength.

Hydroculture
Wood fibres can be used as a substrate in hydroponics. Wood wool (i.e. wood slivers) have been a substrate of choice since the earliest days of the hydroponics research. However, more recent research suggests that wood fibre can have detrimental effects on "plant growth regulators".

Composites
Wood fibres can be combined with thermoplastics to create strong, waterproof products for outdoor use, such as deck boards or outdoor furniture.

See also
 Hemp paper
 Pulp (paper)
 Woodfibre, British Columbia
 Wood flour, a form of wood fibre

References

Further reading
 Over $27 million to help more wood fibre use
 Terrassendielen (in German)
 Drivable wood fibre surfaces

Cellulose